Palairet is a surname, and may refer to:

 Elias Palairet (1713–1765), Dutch minister and classical scholar
 Jean Palairet (1697–1774), French cartographer
 Lionel Palairet (1870–1933), English cricketer 
 Sir Michael Palairet (1882–1956), British diplomat
 Richard Palairet (1871–1955), English cricketer